Greg Gaines may refer to:
 Greg Gaines (defensive lineman) (born 1996), defensive lineman for the NFL's Los Angeles Rams
 Greg Gaines (linebacker) (born 1958), NFL linebacker and coach